The São Paulo state football team represents São Paulo in association football.

History

The first steps of football in Brazil 
In order to measure the strength of the two first centers of association football in Brazil, the need arose to hold fixtures between footballers who played in the states of São Paulo and the Federal District of Rio de Janeiro. In 1901, the first combined teams were formed, later to later to become the more formalised state teams.

These were the ones responsible for holding the first international football match to take place in Brazilian territory. On 31 July 1906, at the Velódromo da Consolação, São Paulo (called "Brazilian representatives") against the South Africa FA took place. The South Africans (at the time, known as the All-White Team), was touring across South America to play against Argentine teams, much more developed than the incipient Brazilian football. The result was a resounding 6–0 for the Africans.

In 1907, the first interstate competition in Brazil took place, the Taça Brasil de Seleções, putting rivals Rio de Janeiro and São Paulo face to face. São Paulo won both matches and conquered the first trophy in its history.

With the growth of football in the country, the games of the São Paulo team became more frequent in the 1910s, with emphasis on international matches representing Brazil (which had not yet had the national team established) against Argentina in 1912 and Chile twice during 1913. The difference in development between Brazilian football and its neighbors at that time was still large, and São Paulo was defeated in all three matches.

"The Tiger" Friedenreich era
The great name of the São Paulo team is undoubtedly Arthur Friedenreich. "The Tiger", as he became famous after CA Paulistano's tour of Europe in 1925, the first great Brazilian footballer recognized internationally, lived his heyday during the 1920s, a time when state selections were consolidated as de facto like teams, and not merely representations of the leagues.

This time, it was the state of São Paulo that was far ahead in development compared to the others, so big wins, some into double digits, were frequent in front of the other competitors. Friedenreich scored exactly 80 goals with the Seleção Paulista team shirt, more than Pelé for Brazil (77 goals). Another monster of that period, Feitiço, scored 69 goals, followed by Petronilho de Brito with 54.

Brazilian State Teams Championship
At that time, the state teams from Minas Gerais, Paraná, Rio Grande do Sul and Bahia were established, which would accompany Rio de Janeiro and São Paulo in the first major competition of the category, the Campeonato Brasileiro de Seleções Estaduais. Organized from the 1920s to the 1960s almost without interruption, this was the golden age of state teams.

Large attendances were drawn to the grounds, which gradually stopped being simple pitches and became stadiums, a fundamental step for Brazil to develop the fever for football we know today. São Paulo is the second most successful team in the Campeonato Brasileiro de Seleções Estaduais, with 13 titles (against 14 by Rio de Janeiro). The Minas Gerais and Bahia team also achieved the glory once.

Clubs football, schedule and decline
With increasingly professionalized football, international club competitions, transfers of great athletes to Europe, and the Brazil national team being a world phenomenon after the 1970 FIFA World Cup, the football of state teams began to fade. Just over twenty matches was played from the 1980s to 2010, the date of the last appearance of the São Paulo team; the state model so acclaimed at the beginning of the 20th century seems to no longer please the conventional supporter. No longer featuring the great idols, and especially, with no space in the tight schedule of Brazil's football calendar, state teams ended up practically buried. Officially, the federations do not consider the teams extinct, but in practice, there is no longer any interest in reactivating them.

With the creation of ConiFA, a São Paulo team was considered for the entity's competitions (São Paulo FAD), but that has no relationship with the Federação Paulista de Futebol, and therefore, with the historical São Paulo state football team.

Players

Following is the information about the players who appeared for the São Paulo state team:

Notable players

 
 Ademir da Guia
 Araken
 Cafu
 Careca
 Carlos Alberto
 Charles Miller
 Coutinho
  Darío Pereyra 
 Djalma Santos
 Feitiço
 Friedenreich
 Jair da Rosa Pinto
  Jorge Valdivia
 Elano
  Freddy Rincón
 Friaça
  José Poy
 Leão
 Leônidas
 Marcelinho Carioca
 Neymar
 Pelé
 Pepe
 Oscar
 Petronilho de Brito
 Remo
 Rivellino
 Socrates
 Teixeirinha
 Toninho Guerreiro
 Viola
 Waldemar de Brito

Top goalscorers

Managers

These are all the managers who as headed São Paulo state team:

 
 Sílvio Lagreca (1931–1939)
 Ângelo Mastrandrea (1941)
 Flávio Costa (1941–1942)
 Armando Del Debbio (1942–1943)
 Vicente Feola (1944)
  Joreca (1946–1947)
 Vicente Feola (1949–1950)
 Aymoré Moreira (1950–1955)
 Osvaldo Brandão (1955)
 Zezé Procópio (1956)
 Aymoré Moreira (1957)
 Lula (1958–1959)
 Aymoré Moreira (1960)
 Lula (1961–1962)
 Osvaldo Brandão (1963)
 Aymoré Moreira (1964–1967)
 Antoninho (1968–1969)
 Alfredo Ramos (1973)
 Otto Glória (1974)
  José Poy (1974–1975)
 Rubens Minelli (1977)
 Carlos Alberto Silva (1980)
 Jorge Vieira (1981)
 Mário Travaglini (1982–1984)
 Candinho (1986)
 Rubens Minelli (1987–1988)
 Jair Pereira (1988–1990)
 Alfredo Mostarda (1990)
 Vanderlei Luxemburgo (1996)
 Oswaldo de Oliveira (1999)
 Tite (2004)
 Caio Júnior (2007)
 Vagner Mancini (2010)

Honours

Campeonato Brasileiro de Seleções Estaduais:
Winners (13): 1922, 1923, 1926, 1929, 1933 (FBF), 1934 (FBF), 1936, 1941, 1942, 1952, 1954, 1956, 1959
Taça Brasil de Seleções: (vs. Rio de Janeiro)
Winners: 1907
Taça Rio-São Paulo de Seleções: (vs. Rio de Janeiro)
Winners: 1916
Taça Füchs: (vs. Rio de Janeiro)
Winners: 1918
Taça Rodrigues Alves: (vs. Rio de Janeiro)
Winners (2): 1919, 1920
Taça Afonso de Camargo: (vs. Paraná)
Winners (3): 1920, 1921, 1922
Taça Washington Luís: (vs. Paraná)
Winners: 1923
Taça Raul Pontual: (vs. Palestra Itália-PR)
Winners: 1926
Taça Castellões: (vs. Rio de Janeiro)
Winners: 1928
Taça Broadway Melody: (vs. Bologna)
Winners: 1929
Taça Júlio Prestes: (vs. Rio de Janeiro)
Winners: 1929
Taça General Artigas: (vs. Nacional/Peñarol)
Winners: 1955
Torneio Garrastazu Médici:
Winners: 1969
Taça ACERJ: (vs. Rio de Janeiro)
Winners: 1981
Troféu Miguel Arraes: (vs. Pernambuco)
Winners: 2007
Copa Inovação: (vs. Rio de Janeiro)
Winners: 2010

Fixtures and results

21st century

The São Paulo team played only three matches in the XXI century:

Last squad 

The following players were called up for the Copa Inovação against Rio de Janeiro, on 9 December 2010.

Head-to-head record

Below is a result summary of all matches São Paulo have played against another Brazilian state teams, FIFA national teams and clubs.

State teams (non-FIFA)

National teams (FIFA)

External links
Gazeta Press – Historical photos of the São Paulo state team
História do Futebol - 1934 São Paulo state team rare photos

References